Miltochrista bivittata is a moth of the family Erebidae. It was described by Arthur Gardiner Butler in 1885. It is found in Japan.

References

 Arctiidae genus list at Butterflies and Moths of the World of the Natural History Museum

bivittata
Moths described in 1885
Moths of Japan